Trilok Chand was an Indian politician.  He was elected to the Lok Sabha, the lower house of the Parliament of India from the Khurja constituency of Uttar Pradesh as a member of the Janata Party.

References

External links
 Official Biographical Sketch in Lok Sabha Website

Janata Party politicians
1935 births
2007 deaths
India MPs 1980–1984
Lok Sabha members from Uttar Pradesh